Ochsattel (el. 820 m.) is a mountain pass in the foothills of the Austrian Alps in the Bundesland of Lower Austria.

It connects St. Aegyd am Neuwalde and Kalte Kuchl. The pass road has a maximum grade of 10 percent.

See also
 List of highest paved roads in Europe
 List of mountain passes

Mountain passes of the Alps
Mountain passes of Lower Austria
Gutenstein Alps